Vincent Pilloni is a French mathematician, specializing in arithmetic geometry and the Langlands program.

Career
Pilloni studied at the École Normale Supérieure and received his doctorate in 2009 from Université Sorbonne Paris Nord with thesis advisor Jacques Tilouine and thesis Arithmétique des variétés de Siegel.

His research deals with, among other topics, the question of how the modularity theorem for elliptic curves over the rational numbers (which led to the proof of Fermat's Last Theorem) can be extended to abelian varieties. With Fabrizio Andreatta and Adrian Iovita, he worked on general modularity conjectures (following Fontaine-Mazur, Langlands, Clozel, and others).

Pilloni is a Chargé de recherche of CNRS at the École normale supérieure de Lyon (UMPA).

In 2018 he was an invited speaker, with Fabrizio Andreatta and Adrian Iovita, at the International Congress of Mathematicians in Rio de Janeiro. In 2018 Pilloni received the Prix Élie Cartan. In 2021 he was awarded the Fermat Prize.

Selected publications
 
 
 
 
 
 
 
 with Benoit Stroh: Surconvergence, ramification et modularité, Astérisque, vol. 382, 2016, pp. 195–266. MR

References

External links
 website at ENS Lyon
 Interview 2018, CNRS (in French)
 
 
 

21st-century French mathematicians
Algebraic geometers
École Normale Supérieure alumni
University of Paris alumni
Living people
Year of birth missing (living people)